The Ruus al Jibal fan-footed gecko (Ptyodactylus ruusaljibalicus) is a species of gecko. It is endemic to the Ru'us al-Jibal, the northernmost of the Hajar Mountains in the Musandam Peninsula shared by Oman and United Arab Emirates.

See also
 Wildlife of Oman
 Wildlife of the United Arab Emirates

References

Ptyodactylus
Reptiles described in 2017